Too Close for Comfort is an American sitcom television series that aired on ABC from November 11, 1980, to May 5, 1983, and in first-run syndication from April 7, 1984, to February 7, 1987. Its name was changed to The Ted Knight Show when the show was retooled in 1986 for what would turn out to be its final season, due to Ted Knight's death. The original concept of the series was based on the 1980s British sitcom Keep It in the Family. Knight plays work-at-home cartoonist Henry Rush, whose two adult daughters live in the downstairs apartment of his San Francisco townhouse. The family moves to Marin County for the show's final season, where Rush becomes a co-owner of the local weekly newspaper.

Synopsis
Henry and Muriel Rush are owners of a two-unit house at 171–173 Buena Vista Avenue East San Francisco, California. Henry is a conservative cartoonist who authors a comic strip called Cosmic Cow with a hand-puppet version of "Cosmic Cow." Muriel is a freelance photographer. They have two adult daughters, Jackie and Sara.

Additional characters include Sara's friend, Monroe Ficus, and Henry's boss, Arthur Wainwright, who was head of Wainwright Publishing. The character of Monroe was originally intended to be used for only a single episode but producers added the character to the series.

Developments in seasons two and three

During its second season, the series' principal stories were focused around Muriel's pregnancy. Henry's niece April comes from Delaware to live with the Rush family. The season concluded with Muriel giving birth to a son, Andrew (later played regularly by twins William and Michael Cannon from 1983 to 1984).

The character of Henry Rush became famous for wearing sweatshirts from various American colleges and universities. Fans would send in sweatshirts from universities around the country hoping they would be used during taping.

In the fall of 1982, ABC moved the series to Thursday nights, which proved to be disastrous and the show saw its ratings fall drastically. The network canceled the series at the conclusion of the season, after falling from #6 for the 1981–82 season, down to #38 for the 1982–83 season.

First-run syndication
During the early 1980s, TV station owner Metromedia was expanding its portfolio of original syndicated programming through its production subsidiary, Metromedia Producers Corporation. When Too Close for Comfort was canceled by ABC, Metromedia Producers Corporation elected to pick up the series and began producing all-new episodes to run on various stations throughout the country. Starting in April 1984, a total of 23 new episodes were broadcast for the show's fourth season, featuring the same cast as seen on the ABC episodes. The show's ratings improved in syndication and Metromedia ordered an additional 30 episodes, airing through November 1985. When the fifth season began, a single child actor, Joshua Goodwin, took over the role of Andrew Rush.

The Ted Knight Show

In late 1985, several changes were made before production started for season six. The largest changes were to the show's title, which was changed to The Ted Knight Show (not to be confused with the short-lived 1978 CBS show of the same name), and to the premise and setting. Henry had retired from drawing Cosmic Cow and, along with Muriel and Andrew, moved to Marin County where Henry bought a share of a local newspaper and became its editor. Monroe followed the Rushes to Marin County and eventually got a job with Henry's paper as a reporter. Veteran actress Pat Carroll joined the cast as Hope Stinson, who owned the majority share of the newspaper and who served as a foil for Henry. In addition, the writers gave the Rushes a live-in nanny for Andrew and brought in Lisa Antille to play the role. Deborah Van Valkenburgh and Lydia Cornell were dropped from the series, as was Audrey Meadows.

First-run episodes of The Ted Knight Show were broadcast starting in April 1986. Twenty-two episodes were produced prior to the summer of 1986 and 12 had aired by mid-July. The revamped show was scheduled to resume production until the death of star Ted Knight, who had been battling colon cancer since 1985. The 10 remaining first-run episodes were broadcast from September 1986 to February 1987, after which those episodes were added to the Too Close for Comfort syndicated rerun package and reverted to the original show title.

Cast
 Ted Knight as Henry Rush
 Nancy Dussault as Muriel Rush
 Deborah Van Valkenburgh as Jackie Rush (1980–1985)
 Lydia Cornell as Sara Rush (1980–1985)
 Jim J. Bullock as Monroe Ficus
 Hamilton Camp as Arthur Wainwright (1981)
 Deena Freeman as April Rush (1981–1982)
 Audrey Meadows as Iris Martin (1982–1983, guest appearances thereafter)
 William and Michael Cannon as Andrew Rush (1983–1984)
 Joshua Goodwin as Andrew Rush (1985–1986)
 Pat Carroll as Hope Stinson (1986)
 Lisa Antille as Lisa Flores (1986)

Notable guest stars
 Peter Haskell
Georgann Johnson
 Hillary B. Smith
 Selma Diamond as Mildred Rafkin
 Jordan Suffin as Officer Brad Turner
 Elyse Knight (daughter of Ted Knight) as Samantha Bishop ("The Runaway," 1984)
 Graham Jarvis as Arthur Wainwright (1985)
 Ernie Wise as Ernie Dockery (1985)
 Jim Davis (creator of the comic strip Garfield) as himself (1986)
 Walter Lantz (creator of Woody Woodpecker) as himself

Episodes

Syndication
The show entered daily broadcast syndication in the fall of 1986, which continued until 2003. The syndication rights for Too Close for Comfort are held by DLT Entertainment, a production and distribution company owned by show producer D.L. Taffner.

, the full series is available through the on-demand section of ViacomCBS's streaming service Pluto TV.

Reruns as of July 2022 air on Antenna TV and Tubi

Home media
Rhino Entertainment Company (under its Rhino Retrovision classic TV entertainment brand) released the first two seasons of Too Close for Comfort on DVD in Region 1 in 2004/2005.  However, Rhino did not obtain the original, uncut versions of the episodes for the Season 1 release and instead used the versions edited for syndication (like those seen on Nickelodeon's sister networks, Nick at Nite and TV Land), which are missing several minutes of footage, including the final scene of each episode before the closing credits. (The episodes are also dubbed to replace references to Oakland with "Oldtown", mostly in a running gag where Henry reacts to the city's name with horror; the joke was perceived as a slur, as Oakland had a much larger Black population than San Francisco.)

There are no future plans for additional releases.

References

External links
 
Interview with Lydia Cornell by Michael Sutton

1980s American sitcoms
1980 American television series debuts
1987 American television series endings
American Broadcasting Company original programming
American television series based on British television series
American television series revived after cancellation
English-language television shows
First-run syndicated television programs in the United States
Television series about families
Television series by Metromedia
Television shows about comics
Television shows set in San Francisco